PRO TV (often stylized as PRO•TV as of 2017) is a Romanian free-to-air television network, launched on 1 December 1995 as the fourth private TV channel in the country (after TV SOTI, Antena 1, and the now-defunct Tele7ABC). It is owned by CME (Central European Media Enterprises), which is owned by PPF Group.

Since 3 September 1999, the company has also been broadcasting its own signal for the Republic of Moldova, under the PRO TV Chișinău brand. It broadcasts, in addition to PRO TV Bucharest programs (according to its own grid, different from the Romanian one), a series of local news and programs and its own advertising slots throughout the day.

Targeting urban adults aged 21 to 54, PRO TV uses a programming strategy of top international series and movies, as well as a wide variety of local productions including news programming, local entertainment and local fiction.

On 29 August 2014, PRO TV launched its own streaming service, called PRO TV Plus, dedicated to original series. Later, in 2021, it was replaced by VOYO(Romanian), which has the same series and original shows of the PRO channels, plus some other exclusives and original content. PRO TV Plus still exists, although VOYO is now promoted much more. Also, unlike PRO TV Plus, which could be used for free, VOYO has monthly or annual subscriptions.

Since 2014, the idents for commercials and promos have become more different from those of other stations, focusing on the stars appearing in the station's shows. During the summer, idents are used that present activities that are practiced in the summer, while in the winter, idents are used that present things and activities related to the winter holidays, but also things related to winter.

Programs 

The station's local productions include entertainment shows, news programs and TV series.

Știrile PRO TV 
Știrile PRO TV is one of the most popular news programs in Romania, with an average rating of 9.3 points and 25.1% market share, being watched by over a million urban viewers. According to 2022 report of Reuters Institute for the Study of Journalism, 76% of the interviewed persons confirmed that PRO TV news are the most trusted ones. According to different research studies, PRO TV has at this moment a reach of 63% in terms of weekly use, 51% of the people watching the programs at least three times per week.

Știrile PRO TV won the International Emmy Award News of 2008 in September 2008.

Andreea Esca is the longest-standing newscaster in Romania. She began her career over 25 years ago, and has spent 23 years with PRO TV.

PRO TV news programs are broadcast daily, multiple times per day.

Newscasters and celebrities 
 Amalia Enache
 Andra
 Andreea Esca
 Andi Moisescu
 Carmen Tănase
 Cătălin Măruță
 Cătălin Radu Tănase
 Cristian Leonte
 Corina Caragea
 Ramona Păun
 Vadim Vîjeu
 Florin Busuioc
 Iulia Pârlea
 Magda Pălimariu
 Daniel Nițoiu
 Mihai Dedu
 Lavinia Petrea
 Andreea Marinescu
 Roxana Hulpe
 Ovidiu Oanță
 Smiley
 Pavel Bartoș
 Tudor Chirilă
 Marius Moga
 Carla's Dreams
 Diana Enache
 Monica Dascălu
 Cabral
 Cosmin Seleși
 Mihaela Radulescu
 Dragoș Bucur
 Mihai Bobonete
 Irina Rimes
 Inna
 Horia Brenciu
 Daniel Pavel
 Theo Rose
 Denis Roabeș
 Adela Popescu
 Bogdan Ciudoiu
 Shurubel
 Lili Sandu
 Chef FOA
 Chef Joseph Hadad
 Chef Radu Dumitrescu

Former stars  
 Alina Eremia (Pariu cu viața, O nouă viață)
 Bebe Cotimanis (Pariu cu viața, O nouă viață, Românii au talent)
 Cătălin Scărlătescu (MasterChef Romania)
 Corina Dănilă
 Cosmin Natantincu (Pe Bune?!)
 Cove (Vorbește lumea)
 Cristian Tabără (Te vezi la Știrile PRO TV, Dăruești și Câștigi)
 Cristina Ciobănescu (Pariu cu viața, O nouă viață)
 Dan C. Mihăilescu (Omul care aduce cartea)
 Dorian Popa (Pariu cu viața, O nouă viață)
 Florin Călinescu (Românii au talent)
 Florin Dumitrescu (MasterChef Romania)
 Ioana Cosma (Ora Exactă în Sport)
 Ioana Maria Moldovan (Poveștiri Adevărate)
 Irina Fodor (Poveștiri de Noapte, Vocea României)
 Iulia Albu
 Loredana Groza (Vocea României)
 Mihai Codreanu (Știrile PRO TV)
 Mihai Mironică (Ora Exactă în Sport)
 Mihai Petre (Dansez pentru tine, Românii au talent, Uite cine dansează)
 Mircea Solcanu (Poveștiri de Noapte)
 Mugur Mihăiescu (Vacanța Mare)
 Oana Stern-Cuzino (Ce se întâmplă doctore?)
 Oana Zăvoranu
 Octavian Strunilă (Jocuri de celebritate, Fort Boyard)
 Paul Ipate (Jocuri de celebritate, Fort Boyard)
 Raluca Arvat (Știrile din sport)
 Ramona Păuleanu (Vremea)
 Răzvan Fodor (MasterChef Romania)
 Sorin Bontea (MasterChef Romania)
 Ștefan Bănică (Dansez pentru tine)
 Teo Trandafir (Teo Show)
 Toni Grecu (Serviciul Român de Comedie, Divertis)
 Victor Slav (Vremea)
 Vlad Gherman (Pariu cu viața, O nouă viață)

Sub-channels and subsidiaries 
 PRO TV International
 Acasă
 PRO Cinema
 PRO Arena
 Acasă GOLD
 PRO TV Chișinău

Awards 
In September 2008, Știrile PRO TV's social campaign “Any idea what your kid is doing right now?” won the International Emmy Awards for “News”, being the first TV station in Eastern Europe to win this award.

At the beginning of 2009, PRO TV won the NAB International Broadcasting Excellence Award for the social campaigns Știrile PRO TV had developed in the previous two years.

Logos 
The bevels and glossy effects were taken away in 2015, and the PRO TV logo is now enclosed in a blue square box.

On 15 January 2016, PRO TV's logo became monochrome and the well-known red-green-blue stripes were removed.

On 28 August 2017, PRO TV changed its logo and graphics again including with other MediaPro neighboring channels, with the exception that Acasă TV changed its name to PRO 2, Acasă Gold to PRO GOLD and Sport.ro to PRO X. On that same day, Știrile PRO TV was rebranded with a new logo and look.

In April 2022, PRO 2 and PRO GOLD reverted to Acasă and Acasă Gold.

Sports competitions 
PRO TV was the main television channel to broadcast the UEFA Champions League in Romania between 2000 and 2009. From 2009 to 2015, it broadcast Cupa României (Romanian Cup), at football, the matches with Romanian teams from UEFA Europa League, and the preliminaries of the UEFA Champions League. From 2015, PRO TV took back the rights for UEFA Champions League and in 2016 it obtained the rights for UEFA Euro 2016. From 2021, PRO TV took back the rights for UEFA Europa League, and also for UEFA Europa Conference League and FA Cup.

PRO TV HD 

On 1 December 2006, PRO TV started to broadcast the 7:00 p.m. newscast in high-definition, thus becoming the first terrestrial television network in Romania to air in HD, starting terrestrial transmission until 2015. The station could be received via DVB-T (digital terrestrial transmission) on Channel 30 in Bucharest.

Slogans

References

External links 
 PRO TV
 PRO TV
 Știrile PRO TV
 

Pro TV
Television stations in Romania
Central European Media Enterprises
Television channels and stations established in 1995
Television networks in Romania
International Emmy Awards Current Affairs & News winners